The pale broad-blazed slider (Lerista petersoni) is a species of skink found in Western Australia.

References

Lerista
Reptiles described in 1976
Taxa named by Glen Milton Storr